Dimitris Nikolaidis (1922 – 21 January 1993) was a Greek actor.

Career

He was born in 1922 in Asia Minor and died in January 1993.  His journey of life began on a ship that headed from Constantinople (now Istanbul) to Piraeus, between them two youngsters, Eftalia and Nikos.  His family moved to Greece to escape the Turkish raids.  During his transfer trip, his father got sick.

The family  settled in Athens as the father's sickness did not  retreat (the problem was mainly genetic as from the father's organism that shook an enzyme, it cleaned the blood without knowing that revived the body).  He died soon after at Sotiria hospital from galloping pneumonia.  Nine days earlier  Dimitris was born.

From his young age he loved sports even track and field.  He was a good student which he was one of the 30 children that passed with scholarship from the Experimental School in Kolonaki which was the greatest school in Athens on Skoufas Street.

During the enemy occupation he had work and power in resistance.   In 1942 Khun ( or Coon)  ran the Art Theatre with a company that used students that included himself.  It had a debut in 1944 with his student Alekos Solomos O Teleftaios Asprokorakas

He participated in Mrs Katerina's company in 1945 in which he stayed  until 1949;  he later went on with Vasilis Logothetidis with a play by Alekos Sakellarios.  For four years, he played with other companies  and in 1954 returned again to act with Logothetidis for  three years in films not only with as Logothetidis' character.

He met  his wife Souli Sabah, a friend of  Ilia Livykou, in Athens   after the  trip that Souli made in Egypt which she stayed (a year before she welcomed to the company) and a month later, recognized on September 15, 1955.

In film, he made his first movie The Girl From the Neighbourhood in 1954 with Smaroula Giouli, Giorgos Fountas, Orestis Makris, etc.  He also played in international roles including America, America by Elia Kazan.  He played in 80 movies.

In the summer of 1965, he played and directed his first theatrical play at the Minoa Theatre Mia Pentaras Niata (Μια Πεντάρας Νιάτα) by Pretenteris-Gialamas which was successful.  That was his beginning.  Without directing, he appeared several times  as an actor in theatrical play Oute gata oute zimia (No Cats, Not Even a Damage) by Alekos Sakellarios-Giannakopoulos Agapi mou Paliogria (Αγάπη Μου Παλιόγρια) with Paul Vassiliadis - Lakis Michailidis, etc.

His last role  on stage was in 1980  in I erotiarides by Vasos Andrianos.

He  worked with several stars including Elli Lambeti, Tzeni Karezi, Lambros Konstantaras, Costas Voutsas, etc.

On the small screen, from his great success are Ekeines kai Ego with Lambros Konstantaras.  He still liked his friend and fellow actor and  theatrical writer Kostas Pretenteris.  Together appeared in O Thyroros which he played a Bulldozer.

In films, he directed only one  movie, a comedy, called I gynaika mou trellathike with Mairi Aroni and Lambros Konstantaras.

His wife was Souli Sabah (or Sambach) (born 1931 in Cairo), an actress and director.  They directed on YENED with a serial Ekeines ki ego with Lambros Konstantaras.

Filmography

References

External links

1922 births
1993 deaths
Male actors from Athens
20th-century Greek male actors
Turkish emigrants to Greece